Parennes is a commune in the Sarthe department in the region of Pays de la Loire in north-western France.

Notable people 
 Doctor Auguste Chaillou (1866 in Parennes - 1915), collaborator of Louis Pasteur and Émile Roux in the discovery of the anti-diphteria serum. Died at the Battle of Vauquois.
 Christian Vélot (1964 in Parennes), biologist, GMO activist and politician.

See also
Communes of the Sarthe department

References

Communes of Sarthe